Nimo was the trademark of a family of small cathode-ray tube (CRTs) used for numerical displays. They were manufactured by Industrial Electronic Engineers (IEE) around the mid-1960s. The tube had ten electron guns with stencils that shaped the electron beam as digits.

Details
The Nimo tube operated on a similar principle as the charactron, but used a much simpler design. They were intended as single digit, simple displays, or as four or six digits by means of a special horizontal magnetic deflection system. Having only three electrode types (a filament, an anode and ten different grids), the driving circuit for this tube was very simple, and as the image was projected on the glass face, it allowed a much wider viewing angle than, for example, Nixie tubes, which Nimo tried to replace.

The tube required 1750 volts direct current (DC) for the anode and also required 1.1 volts for the filaments, as well as a cathode bias for the filaments that enables or disables the display of a character on a specific tube. This allows the display tubes to be multiplexed, simplifying the interface circuitry. 

The German tube manufacturer Telefunken tried to sell an unlicensed copy of the design under the type number XM1000, but was sued by IEE in 1969 and lost, having to destroy all tubes already produced. Only a few survived, most of them not yet labeled.

See also
 Charactron, another tube stencil based character display

References

External links
  by Fran Blanche
  by Fran Blanche

Cathode ray tube
Television technology
Vacuum tube displays